Apuleia leiocarpa is a species of arboreal flowering plant, a member of the family Fabaceae. It is endemic to Brazil, Argentina, Paraguay and Uruguay.

Description
It has a flattened, wide, dense crown. It reaches  in height, with a slightly tortuous and very long trunk, with fins at the base. Rhytidoma that splits into discs. It has small white flowers in clusters, blooming when the leaves fall.

It flowers (austral) from September to November, fruiting from October to December, and seed is harvested from November to February.

Ecology 
It belongs to the upper stratum of tall forests. It reproduces very abundantly in secondary forests; sometimes in pure groupings. It abounds in skirts and highs. It is heliophyte, but partly sciophyte.

Wood
It is yellow, with a specific gravity of 0.8 g / cm3 , with good workability. It has high resistance to weathering and is dimensionally stable. For construction, door frames, windows, bodywork, floors, coatings. In Colombia there is the maquí, whose sawdust (from wood) produces rasquiña and belongs to the genus Apuleia and grows in the middle Magadalena region and the Uraba region, its specific gravity is similar to 1 g / cm3.

Taxonomy 
Apuleia leiocarpa was first described by Julius Rudolph Theodor Vogel in 1919 and published in contributions from the Gray Herbarium of Harvard University.

References

Dialioideae

Flora of South America
Plants described in 1919